The Latin adverb sic ("thus", "just as"; in full: , "thus was it written") inserted after a quoted word or passage indicates that the quoted matter has been transcribed or translated exactly as found in the source text, complete with any erroneous, archaic, or otherwise nonstandard spelling, punctuation, or grammar. It also applies to any surprising assertion, faulty reasoning, or other matter that might be interpreted as an error of transcription.

The typical usage is to inform the reader that any errors or apparent errors in quoted material do not arise from errors in the course of the transcription, but are intentionally reproduced, exactly as they appear in the source text. It is generally placed inside square brackets to indicate that it is not part of the quoted matter.

Sic may also be inserted derisively or sarcastically, to call attention to the original writer's spelling mistakes or erroneous logic, or to show general disapproval or dislike of the material.

Etymology and historical usage
Though occasionally misidentified as an abbreviated word, sic is a Latin adverb used in English as an adverb, and, derivatively, as a noun and a verb. The adverb sic, meaning "intentionally so written", first appeared in English circa 1856. It is derived from the Latin adverb sīc, which means "so, thus, in this manner". According to the Oxford English Dictionary, the verbal form of sic, meaning "to mark with a sic", emerged in 1889, E. Belfort Bax work in The Ethics of Socialism being an early example.

False etymologies
On occasion, sic has been misidentified as an acronym (and therefore sometimes misspelled with periods): "s.i.c." is said to stand for "spelled/said in context", "said in copy", "spelling is correct", "spelled incorrectly", and other such folk etymology phrases. These are all incorrect and are simply backronyms from sic.

Modern usage
Use of sic greatly increased in the mid-20th century. For example, in United States state-court opinions before 1944, sic appeared 1,239 times in the Westlaw database; in those from 1945 to 1990, it appeared 69,168 times, over 55 times as many. Its use as a form of ridicule has been cited as a major factor in this increase. The immoderate use of sic has created some controversy, leading some editors, including bibliographical scholar Simon Nowell-Smith and literary critic Leon Edel, to speak out against it.

Conventional use
Sic, in its bracketed form, is most often inserted into quoted or reprinted material to indicate meticulous accuracy in reproducing the preceding text, despite appearances to the reader of an incorrect or unusual orthography (spelling, punctuation, grammar, syntax, fact, logic, etc.). Several usage guides recommend that a bracketed sic be used primarily as an aid to the reader, not as an indicator of disagreement with the source.

Use to denote archaisms and dialect
Sic may show that an uncommon or archaic expression is reported faithfully, such as when quoting the U.S. Constitution: "The House of Representatives shall  their Speaker ..." However, several writing guidebooks discourage its use with regard to dialect, such as in cases of American and British English spelling differences. The appearance of a bracketed sic after the word analyse in a book review led Bryan A. Garner to comment, "all the quoter (or overzealous editor) [sic] demonstrated was ignorance of British usage".

Ironic use

Occasionally a writer places [sic] after their own words, to indicate that the language has been chosen deliberately for special effect, especially where the writer's ironic meaning may otherwise be unclear. Bryan A. Garner dubbed this use of sic "ironic", providing the following example from Fred Rodell 1955 book Nine Men:

Formatting
Where sic follows the quotation, it takes brackets: [sic]. The word sic is usually treated as a loanword that does not require italics, and the style manuals of New Zealand, Australian and British media outlets generally do not require italicisation. However, italicization is common in the United States, where authorities including APA Style insist upon it.

Because sic is not an abbreviation, placing a full stop/period inside the brackets after the word sic is erroneous, although the California Style Manual suggests styling it as a parenthetical sentence only when used after a complete sentence, like so: (Sic.)

Alternatives

Replacement
Some guides, including The Chicago Manual of Style, recommend "quiet copy-editing" (unless where inappropriate or uncertain) instead of inserting a bracketed sic, such as by substituting in brackets the correct word in place of the incorrect word or by simply replacing an incorrect spelling with the correct one.

Recte

Alternatively, to show both the original and the suggested correction (as they often are in palaeography), one may give the actual form, followed by recte, then the correct form, in brackets. The Latin adverb recte means rightly. 

According to the Journal of Seventeenth-Century Music Style Sheet, there should be no punctuation, for example no colon, before the correct form when using recte.

Read

A third alternative is to follow an error with sic, a comma or colon, "read", and the correct reading, all within square brackets, as in the following example:

See also

 Dictated but not read
 Evidentiality
 Irony punctuation
 List of Latin phrases
 Qere and Ketiv
 Scare quotes
 viz.

References 

Latin words and phrases